Global Bioenergies is a French company producing light liquid hydrocarbons derived from agricultural products using biological methods.

History 
The company was founded in 2008 by Marc Delcourt and Philippe Marlière.

The pilot plant came on stream in May 2015. The company announced production of one tonne of bio-isobutene from 3.84 tonnes of sugars.

Locations 
Created in the Évry Génopole Biocluster in the Essonne department in France, Global Bioenergies operated a demo plant in the ARD (Agro-industrie Recherche et Développements) research and development structure BioDemo pilot in Pomacle-Bazancourt. A pilot for research purposes was constructed at the Fraunhofer Center for Chemical and Biotechnological Processes (Fraunhofer CBP) in Leuna, Germany and is operational since 2016. Global Bioenergies also founded IBN-One, a joint-venture with Cristal Union, to install a plant in France, which should be operational in 2018.

Products 
The first process developed is the production of mehtylpropene (also called isobutene or isobutylene) from glucose, according to a process developed in 2010. The bacteria involved in the transformation process carry artificial enzymatic material developed through genetic engineering.

It is the only company in the world to have designed a conversion method for renewable resources (residual sugars, agricultural and forestry waste) into isobutene. 

Global Bioenergies subsequently agreed a partnership with Audi to produce fuel from the same elementary building blocks as plants (water, hydrogen, carbon dioxide and day light).

References 

Chemical companies of France
French companies established in 2008
Companies based in Île-de-France
Renewable energy companies of France
French brands
Chemical companies established in 2008
Energy companies established in 2008